The Adelaide Generals are an Australian junior ice hockey team based in Adelaide, South Australia playing in the second tier of the Australian Junior Ice Hockey League referred to as AJIHL Tier 2. They represent the first junior ice hockey team from South Australia as part of the proposed 2nd expansion of the AJIHL, which is the most elite level for ice hockey at a national level for ages between 16–20 years old.

Team history
South Australia began posting recruitment for a team into the AJIHL as early as 16 March 2014 when a poster for tryouts was announced via a social media account stating try outs were to begin on 30 March 2014 in preparation for the 2014–15 AJIHL season.

At the beginning of the 2015–16 AJIHL season, a proposal for the next expansion in the AJIHL was made by Ice Hockey Australia to include teams from the Australian states of Queensland and South Australia and the Australian Capital Territory. A Wild Card entry was created in the AJIHL playoffs structure but no further public information would be made available for months but plans to form junior teams in each of these states was underway.

At 18:00 on 21 January 2016, the official announcement of the AJIHL Tier 2 competition was made and details of the team roster and competition times were released.

Players

Current roster

Captains
The first captain for the Adelaide Generals was Ryan Foll

 2015–16 Ryan Foll (C), Marcel McGuiness (A), Zach Boyle (A)
 2016–17 Ryan Foll (C), Remy McGuiness (A), Zach Boyle (A)

Head coaches
The first head coach for the Adelaide Generals was Neil Boyle.

 2015–16 Neil Boyle
 2016–17 Neil Boyle

See also

Australian Junior Ice Hockey League
Melbourne Glaciers
Melbourne Whalers
Perth Pelicans
Sydney Sabres
Sydney Wolf Pack
Ice Hockey Australia
Ice Hockey New South Wales
Australian Women's Ice Hockey League
Australian Ice Hockey League
Jim Brown Trophy
Goodall Cup
Joan McKowen Memorial Trophy

References

Australian Junior Ice Hockey League
Ice hockey teams in Australia
Ice hockey clubs established in 2015
Sporting clubs in Adelaide
2015 establishments in Australia